The 2020 African Men's Handball Championship was the 24th edition of the African Men's Handball Championship and was held from 16 to 26 January 2020 in Tunisia. It acted as the African qualifying tournament for the 2020 Summer Olympics in Tokyo and 2021 World Men's Handball Championship in Egypt.

Egypt won their seventh title by defeating Tunisia 27–22 in the final.

Venues

Qualified teams

Note: Bold indicates champion for that year. Italic indicates host for that year.

Draw
The draw was held on 19 October 2019 in Tunis. Senegal withdrew before the tournament.

Squads

Match officials
On 13 January 2020, The African Handball Confederation (CAHB) has selected eight couples of referees.

Preliminary round
All times are local (UTC+1).

Group A

Group B

Group C

Group D

Placement round
Points and goals gained in the preliminary group against teams that advanced, were taken over.

Group 1

Group 2

15th place game

13th place game

Eleventh place game

Ninth place game

Main round
Points and goals gained in the preliminary group against teams that advanced, were taken over.

Group I

Group II

Knockout stage

Bracket

Fifth place bracket

5–8th place semifinals

Semifinals

Seventh place game

Fifth place game

Third place game

Final

Final ranking and awards

All-Star Team
The all-star team and awards were announced on 3 February 2020.

References

External links

Results at todor66

2020 Men
African Men's Handball Championship
African Men's Handball Championship
International handball competitions hosted by Tunisia
Sports competitions in Radès
African Men's Handball Championship